Thomas Elijah "Eli" Garner (born February 14, 1991 in Durham, North Carolina) is an American soccer player. He has previously played for the Orange County Blues and the Dayton Dutch Lions.

External links
 Tar Heels profile

1991 births
Living people
American soccer players
North Carolina Tar Heels men's soccer players
UNC Greensboro Spartans men's soccer players
Dayton Dutch Lions players
Orange County SC players
Richmond Kickers players
USL Championship players
Soccer players from North Carolina
Association football forwards